Aq Bolagh (also Romanized as Āq Bolāgh; also known as Āgh Bolāgh) is a village in Dasht Rural District, in the Central District of Meshgin Shahr County, Ardabil Province, Iran. At the 2006 census, its population was 1,489, in 312 families.

References 

Towns and villages in Meshgin Shahr County